The financial service industry in the United Kingdom contributed £174 billion in 2021, or 8.3% of total UK gross value that year. It creates significant benefits for the UK, European and global economies.

History 
The sector contributed a gross value of £86 billion to the UK economy in 2004. The industry employed around 1.2 million people in the third quarter of 2012 (around 4% of the British workforce). The estimated amount of total taxes paid by the Financial Services Sector in the year to 31 March 2012 is £63bn, 11.6% of the total UK government tax receipts.

See also
Banking in the United Kingdom
Economy of London § Financial services
Economy of the United Kingdom § Financial and business services
Financial centre
Financial services § Financial exports
Global financial system
Insurance in the United Kingdom
List of banks in the United Kingdom
List of institutional investors in the United Kingdom
UK company law

References